"Home" is the second single by British rock band Love Amongst Ruin. The single was released on 25 October 2010 on Ancient B Records.

Reception
AAA Music said of the single, "like So Sad (Fade), it’s based on a constant guitar riff that supports Steve’s distorted, languid and angry vocals, but it has not such a big impact".

Track listing

7" single
 "Home"
 "Home (Ashley Casselle & Mark O'Brien Remix 7" Edit)"

Remixes
A remix EP was released along with the single.

Credits
Steve Hewitt – vocals, drums, bass, guitar, piano
Jon Thorne – bass, guitar, Logic, string arrangements
Nick Hewitt – guitar
Donald Ross Skinner – guitar, bass, piano

References

2010 singles
Love Amongst Ruin songs
2010 songs
Songs written by Steve Hewitt